MILLER (Minimally Invasive Limited Ligation Endoluminal-assisted Revision) banding is a minimally invasive technique for banding dialysis accesses in cases of Dialysis-associated Steal Syndrome. MILLER banding was first proposed in 2006 by Goel N., Miller G.A., and colleagues.

Procedure
A fistula or graft is dissected away through a small incision. An inflated intra-luminal balloon is used to provide a solid structure (thus allowing for precise sizing of the band), and a Prolene suture is tied around the access in the region of the balloon.

References

 

Nephrology
Renal dialysis